Computer-aided design (CAD) is the use of computers (or ) to aid in the creation, modification, analysis, or optimization of a design. This software is used to increase the productivity of the designer, improve the quality of design, improve communications through documentation, and to create a database for manufacturing. Designs made through CAD software are helpful in protecting products and inventions when used in patent applications. CAD output is often in the form of electronic files for print, machining, or other manufacturing operations. The terms computer-aided drafting (CAD) and computer aided design and drafting (CADD) are also used.

Its use in designing electronic systems is known as electronic design automation (EDA). In mechanical design it is known as mechanical design automation (MDA), which includes the process of creating a technical drawing with the use of computer software.

CAD software for mechanical design uses either vector-based graphics to depict the objects of traditional drafting, or may also produce raster graphics showing the overall appearance of designed objects. However, it involves more than just shapes. As in the manual drafting of technical and engineering drawings, the output of CAD must convey information, such as materials, processes, dimensions, and tolerances, according to application-specific conventions.

CAD may be used to design curves and figures in two-dimensional (2D) space; or curves, surfaces, and solids in three-dimensional (3D) space.

CAD is an important industrial art extensively used in many applications, including automotive, shipbuilding, and aerospace industries, industrial and architectural design (building information modeling), prosthetics, and many more. CAD is also widely used to produce computer animation for special effects in movies, advertising and technical manuals, often called DCC digital content creation. The modern ubiquity and power of computers means that even perfume bottles and shampoo dispensers are designed using techniques unheard of by engineers of the 1960s. Because of its enormous economic importance, CAD has been a major driving force for research in computational geometry, computer graphics (both hardware and software), and discrete differential geometry.

The design of geometric models for object shapes, in particular, is occasionally called computer-aided geometric design (CAGD).

Overview

Computer-aided design is one of the many tools used by engineers and designers and is used in many ways depending on the profession of the user and the type of software in question.

CAD is one part of the whole digital product development (DPD) activity within the product lifecycle management (PLM) processes, and as such is used together with other tools, which are either integrated modules or stand-alone products, such as:

Computer-aided engineering (CAE) and finite element analysis (FEA, FEM)
Computer-aided manufacturing (CAM) including instructions to computer numerical control (CNC) machines
Photorealistic rendering and motion simulation.
Document management and revision control using product data management (PDM)

CAD is also used for the accurate creation of photo simulations that are often required in the preparation of environmental impact reports, in which computer-aided designs of intended buildings are superimposed into photographs of existing environments to represent what that locale will be like, where the proposed facilities are allowed to be built. Potential blockage of view corridors and shadow studies are also frequently analyzed through the use of CAD.

Using four properties which are history, features, parameterization, and high-level constraints are helpful in everyday engineering. The construction history can be used to look back into the model's personal features and work on the single area rather than the whole model. Parameters and constraints can be used to determine the size, shape, and other properties of the different modeling elements. The features in the CAD system can be used for the variety of tools for measurement such as tensile strength, yield strength, electrical, or electromagnetic properties. Also its stress, strain, timing, or how the element gets affected in certain temperatures, etc.

Types

There are several different types of CAD, each requiring the operator to think differently about how to use them and design their virtual components in a different manner for each.

2D CAD 
There are many producers of the lower-end 2D systems, including a number of free and open-source programs. These provide an approach to the drawing process without all the fuss over scale and placement on the drawing sheet that accompanied hand drafting since these can be adjusted as required during the creation of the final draft.

3D CAD 
3D wireframe is basically an extension of 2D drafting (not often used today) into a three-dimensional space. Each line has to be manually inserted into the drawing. The final product has no mass properties associated with it and cannot have features directly add to it, such as holes. The operator approaches these in a similar fashion to the 2D systems, although many 3D systems allow using the wireframe model to make the final engineering drawing views.

3D "dumb" solids are created in a way analogous to manipulations of real-world objects (not often used today). Basic three-dimensional geometric forms (prisms, cylinders, spheres, rectangles) have solid volumes added or subtracted from them as if assembling or cutting real-world objects. Two-dimensional projected views can easily be generated from the models. Basic 3D solids don't usually include tools to easily allow the motion of the components, set their limits to their motion, or identify interference between components.

There are two types of 3D solid modeling

 Parametric modeling allows the operator to use what is referred to as "design intent". The objects and features are created modifiable. Any future modifications can be made by changing on how the original part was created. If a feature was intended to be located from the center of the part, the operator should locate it from the center of the model. The feature could be located using any geometric object already available in the part, but this random placement would defeat the design intent. If the operator designs the part as it functions the parametric modeler is able to make changes to the part while maintaining geometric and functional relationships.
 Direct or explicit modeling provide the ability to edit geometry without a history tree With direct modeling, once a sketch is used to create geometry the sketch is incorporated into the new geometry and the designer just modifies the geometry without needing the original sketch. As with parametric modeling, direct modeling has the ability to include the relationships between selected geometry (e.g., tangency, concentricity).

FreeForm CAD 
The top-end systems offer the capabilities to incorporate more organic, aesthetic and ergonomic features into the designs. Freeform surface modeling is often combined with solids to allow the designer to create products that fit the human form and visual requirements as well as they interface with the machine.

Technology

Originally software for CAD systems was developed with computer languages such as Fortran, ALGOL but with the advancement of object-oriented programming methods this has radically changed. Typical modern parametric feature-based modeler and freeform surface systems are built around a number of key C modules with their own APIs. A CAD system can be seen as built up from the interaction of a graphical user interface (GUI) with NURBS geometry or boundary representation (B-rep) data via a geometric modeling kernel. A geometry constraint engine may also be employed to manage the associative relationships between geometry, such as wireframe geometry in a sketch or components in an assembly.

Unexpected capabilities of these associative relationships have led to a new form of prototyping called digital prototyping. In contrast to physical prototypes, which entail manufacturing time in the design. That said, CAD models can be generated by a computer after the physical prototype has been scanned using an industrial CT scanning machine. Depending on the nature of the business, digital or physical prototypes can be initially chosen according to specific needs.

Today, CAD systems exist for all the major platforms (Windows, Linux, UNIX and Mac OS X); some packages support multiple platforms.

Currently, no special hardware is required for most CAD software. However, some CAD systems can do graphically and computationally intensive tasks, so a modern graphics card, high speed (and possibly multiple) CPUs and large amounts of RAM may be recommended.

The human-machine interface is generally via a computer mouse but can also be via a pen and digitizing graphics tablet. Manipulation of the view of the model on the screen is also sometimes done with the use of a Spacemouse/SpaceBall. Some systems also support stereoscopic glasses for viewing the 3D model. Technologies that in the past were limited to larger installations or specialist applications have become available to a wide group of users. These include the CAVE or HMDs and interactive devices like motion-sensing technology

Software

Starting around the mid-1960s, with the IBM Drafting System, computer-aided design systems began to provide more capability than just an ability to reproduce manual drafting with electronic drafting, the cost-benefit for companies to switch to CAD became apparent. The benefits of CAD systems over manual drafting are the capabilities one often takes for granted from computer systems today; automated generation of bills of materials, auto layout in integrated circuits, interference checking, and many others. Eventually, CAD provided the designer with the ability to perform engineering calculations. During this transition, calculations were still performed either by hand or by those individuals who could run computer programs. CAD was a revolutionary change in the engineering industry, where draftsmen, designers, and engineering roles begin to merge. It did not eliminate departments as much as it merged departments and empowered draftsmen, designers, and engineers. CAD is an example of the pervasive effect computers were beginning to have on the industry.
Current computer-aided design software packages range from 2D vector-based drafting systems to 3D solid and surface modelers. Modern CAD packages can also frequently allow rotations in three dimensions, allowing viewing of a designed object from any desired angle, even from the inside looking out. Some CAD software is capable of dynamic mathematical modeling.

CAD technology is used in the design of tools and machinery and in the drafting and design of all types of buildings, from small residential types (houses) to the largest commercial and industrial structures (hospitals and factories).

CAD is mainly used for detailed engineering of 3D models or 2D drawings of physical components, but it is also used throughout the engineering process from conceptual design and layout of products, through strength and dynamic analysis of assemblies to definition of manufacturing methods of components. It can also be used to design objects such as jewelry, furniture, appliances, etc. Furthermore, many CAD applications now offer advanced rendering and animation capabilities so engineers can better visualize their product designs. 4D BIM is a type of virtual construction engineering simulation incorporating time or schedule-related information for project management.

CAD has become an especially important technology within the scope of computer-aided technologies, with benefits such as lower product development costs and a greatly shortened design cycle. CAD enables designers to layout and develop work on screen, print it out and save it for future editing, saving time on their drawings.

License management software 
In the beginning of 2000, some CAD system software vendors might have shipped their distributions with a dedicated license manager software that might control how often or how many users can utilize CAD system. It could run either on a local machine (by loading from a local storage device) or a local network fileserver and was usually tied to a specific IP address in latter case.

List of software packages

CAD software enables engineers and architects to design, inspect and manage engineering projects within an integrated graphical user interface (GUI) on a personal computer system. Most applications support solid modeling with boundary representation (B-Rep) and NURBS geometry, and enable the same to be published in a variety of formats. A geometric modeling kernel is a software component that provides solid modeling and surface modeling features to CAD applications.

Based on market statistics, commercial software from Autodesk, Dassault Systems, Siemens PLM Software, and PTC dominate the CAD industry. The following is a list of major CAD applications, grouped by usage statistics.

Commercial software

 AC3D
 Alibre Design
 ArchiCAD (Graphisoft)
 AutoCAD (Autodesk)
 Autodesk Inventor
 AxSTREAM
 BricsCAD
 CATIA (Dassault Systèmes)
 Cobalt
 CorelCAD
 Fusion 360 (Autodesk)
 IntelliCAD
 IRONCAD
 KeyCreator (Kubotek)
 Landscape Express
 MEDUSA
 MicroStation (Bentley Systems)
 Modelur (AgiliCity)
 Onshape
 Promine
 PTC Creo (successor to Pro/ENGINEER)
 PunchCAD
 Remo 3D
 Revit (Autodesk)
 Rhinoceros 3D
 Siemens NX
 SketchUp
 Solid Edge (Siemens)
 SolidWorks (Dassault Systèmes)
 SpaceClaim
 T-FLEX CAD
 TranslateCAD
 TurboCAD
 Vectorworks (Nemetschek)

Open-source software

 BRL-CAD
 FreeCAD
 LibreCAD
 LeoCAD
 OpenSCAD
 QCAD
 Salome (software)
 SolveSpace

Freeware
 BricsCAD Shape
 TiffinCAD
 Tinkercad (successor to Autodesk 123D)

CAD kernels
 ACIS by Spatial
 C3D Toolkit by C3D Labs
 Open CASCADE Open Source
 Parasolid by Siemens
 ShapeManager by Autodesk

See also

 3D computer graphics
 3D printing
 Additive Manufacturing File Format
 Algorithmic art
 CAD standards
 Coarse space (numerical analysis)
 Comparison of 3D computer graphics software
 Comparison of CAD, CAM, and CAE file viewers
 Comparison of computer-aided design software
 Comparison of EDA software (Electronic Design Automation)
 Computer-aided industrial design
 Digital architecture
 Electronic design automation
 Engineering optimization
 Finite element method
 ISO 128
 ISO 10303 (STEP)
 Model-based definition
 Molecular design software
 Open-source hardware
 Rapid prototyping
 Responsive computer-aided design
 Space mapping
 Surrogate model
 System integration
 Virtual prototyping
 Virtual reality

References

External links
 MIT 1982 CAD lab
 
 
 
 

 
 
Design engineering
CAD